Richard Howard Bertram  (4 February 1916 – 28 April 2000) was a champion sailor on powerboats and racing yachts and a leading boat builder and broker.  Born in East Orange, New Jersey, Bertram learned to sail at a young age with his parents on the waters of Barnegat Bay.  He owned his first boat at age 8, sailed in his first race at age 10 and was skipper of intercollegiate championship boats while attending Cornell University.  After college, Bertram continued competing in numerous races throughout the world and was notably referred to by Sports Illustrated as "one of the finest ocean racers anywhere".  In 1947, Bertram relocated to Miami, FL, where he opened Richard Bertram & Company, a successful yacht brokerage firm.  Among his clients were Aristotle Onassis, the Aga Khan, King Hussein of Jordan and Prince Bertil of Sweden.  With his yacht brokerage business successful, Bertram continued racing and set standards in the World Offshore Powerboat circuit.  Often, he raced in his own 31' Bertram Lucky Moppie.  He founded Bertram Yacht, a Miami-based manufacturer of production pleasure boats, in 1960.  Bertram Yacht began the first large production runs of boats with C. Raymond Hunt's revolutionary deep-V hull design.  In 1963 Richard Bertram licensed International Marine of Scoresby, Victoria, Australia to manufacture Bertram yachts; however, he left Bertram Yacht in 1964 to focus on his brokerage business, and Bertram Yacht changed ownership several times in the decades after that.

Races
 Lightning World 1948, Champion
 Lightning World 1949, Champion
 Southern Ocean Racing Conference 1949, Champion Tiny Teal
 Southern Ocean Racing Conference 1950, Champion Ticonderoga
 Southern Ocean Racing Conference 1951, Champion Belle of the West
 Havana-San Sebastian Transatlantic Race 1951, Champion Malabar XIII
 Cat Cay Race 1955, Champion Finisterre
 Newport - Bermuda Race (Bermuda Race) 1956, Champion Finisterre
 Miami-Nassau Race 1956, Champion Doodles II
 Miami-Nassau Race 1957, Champion Doodles III
 Newport - Bermuda Race (Bermuda Race) 1958, Champion Finisterre
 America’s Cup 1958 Vim
 Newport - Bermuda Race (Bermuda Race) 1960, Champion Finisterre
 Miami-Nassau Race 1960 Champion Lucky Moppie
 Miami-Nassau Race 1961, Champion Lucky Moppie
 Miami-Nassau Race 1962, Champion Lucky Moppie
 Miami-Nassau Race 1963, Champion Lucky Moppie
 Miami-Nassau Race 1964, Second Place Lucky Moppie
 Cowes Torquay Race 1965
 Transatlantic Race Malabar VII
 Transatlantic Race Ondinne

Awards
 World Champion of Offshore Boat Racing 1965
 NMMA (National Marine Manufacturers Association) 2007 Hall of Fame Inductee 
 Barnegat Bay Sailing Hall of Fame 2008 Inductee

References

Further reading
 Bertram, Kate and Richard Bertram. Caribbean Cruise. A story of their voyage from New York to the West Indies and their five years in the tropics. W.W. Norton 1948

External links
 Richard Bertram Life and Times
 Bertram 31
 Nassau Cup Race
 Bermuda Race

Hi brody

Cornell University alumni
American boat builders
American motorsport people
1916 births
2000 deaths
Sportspeople from New Jersey
American sailors (sport)